Julián Antonio Chicco (born 13 January 1998) is an Argentine professional footballer who plays as a midfielder for Colón.

Club career 

Chicco is a youth exponent from Boca Juniors. On 1 May 2016, he made his first team debut in a league game against Argentinos Juniors.

References

1998 births
Living people
Argentine people of Italian descent
Argentine footballers
Association football midfielders
Boca Juniors footballers
Club Atlético Patronato footballers
Club Atlético Sarmiento footballers
Club Atlético Colón footballers
Argentine Primera División players